The Missouri Rhineland is a geographical area of Missouri that extends from west of St. Louis to slightly east of Jefferson City, located mostly in the Missouri River Valley on both sides of the river. Dutzow, the first permanent German settlement in Missouri, was founded in 1832 by Baron von Bock. The area is named after the Rhineland region in central Europe, a wine-growing area around the Rhine river, by German-Americans who noticed similarities in the two regions' soil and topography.

The soils of the Missouri River Valley and surrounding areas are mainly rocky residual soils left after the carbonate (mainly limestone) bedrock weathered away to impurities of clayey soil and chert fragments. Farther to the north, glacial deposits and wind-deposited loess, a silty soil also associated with the glaciers, are intermingled with the residual soils.

While the soil could support other crops, the steep slopes of these areas were better used for viticulture. German settlers established the first wineries in the mid-19th century. Italian immigrants later established their own vineyards, especially near Rolla in Phelps County. By 1920, Missouri was the second-largest wine-producing state in the nation. Then came Prohibition, which ruined the industry.

In the 1960s, local winemakers began to rebuild, part of a movement in states across the country. In 1980, An area around Augusta, Missouri, was designated by the federal government as the first American Viticultural Area (AVA), and one around Hermann, Missouri, was designated an AVA in 1983. Much of the region of the Missouri Rhineland from Augusta to Jefferson City along the Missouri River is part of the larger Ozark Mountain AVA.

History
A German attorney and author named Gottfried Duden purchased land on the north side of the Missouri River along Lake Creek that he first visited in 1824. He was investigating the possibilities of settlement in the area by his countrymen. In 1827 he returned to Germany, which he felt was overpopulated. There in 1829 he published Bericht über eine Reise nach den westlichen Staaten Nordamerikas (Journal of a trip to the western states of North America), extolling the attractions of Missouri.

In 1832, members of the small so-called Berlin Society communally purchased land that became the village of Dutzow, founded by Baron von Bock of Mecklenburg, Germany in March 1834.

Led by Friedrich Muench and Paul Follenius of the Giessen Emigration Society, German immigrants arrived in the area in 1834. Resident Friedrich Muench became known for his expertise in the cultivation of grapes and wine making. Muench was a prominent writer and lecturer and wrote a number of books. He frequently wrote under the name of "Far West". His book American Grape Culture was published in 1859. Also, in 1859, Friedrich Muench's brother George founded Mount Pleasant Winery based upon the principles and advice of expert viticulturist, Friedrich Muench.

In 1836 the German Settlement Society began to look for a place to build a German community insulated from the increasing diversity of nationalities found in many American settlements. They chose to settle in Hermann, Missouri, and the first settlers arrived in 1837. An early leader of the settlers was George Bayer, who arrived in early 1838.  The soil on the hillsides surrounding the settlement was not appropriate for many forms of agriculture, but was ideal for grapes. Hermann's trustees decided to sell tracts of land with the agreement that they be planted as vineyards.

During the American Civil War, Missouri ranked as the top wine-producing state; then slipped to No. 2. In 1920, Missouri had more than 100 wineries. Then came Prohibition, which outlawed the production of most alcoholic beverages. Vineyards were pulled up and used for other purposes or left untended. Winery facilities were converted to serve other purposes or left to decay. Just one winery was allowed to continue operations: Saint Stanislaus Seminary in Florissant, which made sacramental wine.

Significant wine-making in Missouri did not resume until the 1960s and 1970s, when small winemakers began building in many different areas of the United States. In 1965, Stone Hill Winery in Hermann, south of the Missouri River, was the first in the state to be re-established.

In 1980, the Augusta AVA in Augusta was designated the first American Viticultural Area (AVA) in the United States; Hermann AVA in Hermann was designated an AVA three years later. As of 2009, 88 wineries were operating in Missouri.

The Weinstrasse
The area along Route 94 between Defiance and Marthasville has the highest concentration of wineries in the state. Many sit high  on south-facing bluffs above the river. The highway, which runs largely parallel to the Katy Trail, has been nicknamed the Missouri Weinstrasse (wine route).

See also
Missouri wine
Stone Hill Winery
Les Bourgeois Winery
Mount Pleasant Winery
Giessen Emigration Society
Alcohol laws of Missouri
List of wineries in Missouri
Isidor Bush

References

External links
"Historic Hermann, MO, Heart of Missouri Wine Country", Hermann, Missouri Website
"History of Washington", Washington Historical Society
German American History Sources, Northwest Missouri State University Library

 
Regions of Missouri
Missouri wine
German-American culture in Missouri